Esquimalt-Port Renfrew was a provincial electoral district in the Canadian province of British Columbia from 1979 to 1986.  Its predecessor riding was Esquimalt.  Its principal successor-riding, which is the current riding, is Esquimalt-Metchosin.

For other Greater Victoria area ridings see Victoria (electoral districts).  For other Vancouver Island ridings see Vancouver Island (electoral districts) or Nanaimo (electoral districts).

Demographics

Political geography

Notable elections

Notable MLAs

Electoral history 
Note:  Winners in each election are in bold.	

|Progressive Conservative
|William James (Bill) Langlois
|align="right"|1,462 	 	
|align="right"|6.05%

|Independent
|Wayne Arthur Williams
|align="right"|131
|align="right"|0.54%
|- bgcolor="white"
!align="right" colspan=3|Total valid votes
!align="right"|24,176 
|- bgcolor="white"
!align="right" colspan=3|Total rejected ballots
!align="right"|523
|}

 
|Liberal
|William Charles Stanley
|align="right"|580 			 	
|align="right"|2.06%
|align="right"|
|align="right"|unknown
|- bgcolor="white"
!align="right" colspan=3|Total valid votes
!align="right"|28,220 
!align="right"|100.00%
!align="right"|
|- bgcolor="white"
!align="right" colspan=3|Total rejected ballots
!align="right"|299
!align="right"|
!align="right"|
|- bgcolor="white"
!align="right" colspan=3|Turnout
!align="right"|%
!align="right"|
!align="right"|
|}

 
|Liberal
|Robert Henry Jones
|align="right"|1,293 	 		 	 	
|align="right"|4.54%
|align="right"|
|align="right"|unknown

|- bgcolor="white"
!align="right" colspan=3|Total valid votes
!align="right"|28,462 	
!align="right"|100.00%
!align="right"|
|- bgcolor="white"
!align="right" colspan=3|Total rejected ballots
!align="right"|250
!align="right"|
!align="right"|
|- bgcolor="white"
!align="right" colspan=3|Turnout
!align="right"|%
!align="right"|
!align="right"|
|}

Sources 
Elections BC Historical Returns

Former provincial electoral districts of British Columbia on Vancouver Island